Muhammad Gias Uddin is a Bangladesh Nationalist Party politician and a former Member of Parliament from Narayanganj-4 and founder of Gias Uddin Islamic Model College

Early life 
Mohammad Giasuddin was born on 18th Boishakh, Tuesday 1359 Bangla AD in a reputed Muslim family in Siddhirganj village of Siddhirganj police station, Narayanganj subdivision of Dhaka district. His father's name is Mohammad Abul hashem Miah and mother's name is Musammat Yaun Nesa. He is the only son among four children of his parents. His ancestors are hereditary residents of this place. Educational Life: His primary educational life begins with tutoring and goning to local mosques. Quran and Namaz, Roza education started there. He studied from the second class to the fifth class in Siddhirganj Government Primary School of Siddhirganj area (now Siddhirganj Government Primary School North). He studied from 6th to 7th class at M.W. High School, from 8th to 9th class at Godnail High School and lastly passed SSC in Science Department from Narayanganj Bar Academy High School. He passed HSC in science department from the then Dhaka Quaid-i-Azam (now Sehrawadi) College. In 1972, he was admitted to the Department of Public Administration in Dhaka University and later received B.S.S. (Hons.), M.S.S. from the Department of Sociology. While studying at the university, he was a resident student of Salimullah Muslim Hall.

In 1971 when he was a HSC second year student he participated in the Great War of Liberation and served with credit as a wartime Group Commander. In 1977 (while studying at Dhaka University) and in 1982, he was elected as the chairman of Siddhirganj Union Parishad twice. In 1982, was elected as the chairman of Fatullah Thana Development Committee and served for two years. In 1985, was elected Chairman of Narayanganj Sadar Upazila Parishad and he served as Secretary General for the first two years of Bangladesh Upazila Chairman Parishad and as Chairman for the next two years. He was elected Member of National Parliament from Narayanganj-4 Constituency in 8th National Parliament Election held in 2001. At that time he served as a member of the Standing Committee of Ministry of Liberation War and Ministry of Social Welfare. He joined the East Pakistan Chhatra League in 1966 as an ordinary member while studying in class eight at Godnail High School. He worked in various organizational positions in student organizations and political parties at the police station, district, and national levels.

Cooperative movement 
He formed Narayanganj Sadar Upazila Central Cooperative Society. He served as founder chairman there. He participated in the cooperative movement and served as the elected chairman of several central and national level cooperative institutions including Narayanganj Central Cooperative Bank Limited, Bangladesh Cooperative Insurance Society Limited.

Establishment of institutions and teaching life 
After participating in the SSC examination in 1969 he accompanied his favorite colleagues in the traditional Siddhirganj Pragati Sangsad, he established Siddhirganj Bavati Mahon High School. Later this school was included in the pilot project. and promoted up to twelfth standard. While studying in college and university, he taught as a part-time teacher for about 8/10 years in this college. Besides he worked as an entrepreneur to establish various educational institutes including
Sanarpar Sheikh Mortuza Ali High School
Mizmiji Painadi Bekmat Ali High School
Mizmiji Paschimpara High School
Roshan Ara College.

During his tenure as Chairman of Upazila Parishad and Member of National Parliament, he served as the Chairman of the Management Committee of about 19/20 madrasas, schools and colleges. While he was the upazila chairman, he was the first to introduce the fifth class final examination system.

Other educational institutes established by him:
 2002, Giasuddin Islamic Model School in Hirajheel
 2010, at the same place he started Giasuddin Islamic Model College
 2011, Khadijatul Cobra Mahila Madrasa in Siddhirganj
 2015, at Siddhirganj, Bir Muktijoddha Giasuddin Islamic Model School
 2019, Bir Muktijoddha Giasuddin Islamic Girls School
 2021, Bir Muktijoddha Giasuddin Islamic New Model Madrasa
 2022, Delpara Vir Mukti Jodha Ghiyasuddin Islamic Model School

In 2019, he established Mouchak Ward No. 2 "Bir Muktijedha Giasuddin Islamic City School". He founded "MA Hashem-Yatun Nessa Foundation" in the name of his respected parents in 2002 and is running the Madrasas, Schools and Colleges established by him through that foundation in a completely private manner. Giasuddin Islamic University and Giasuddin Islamic Medical College and Hospital establishments are also on in his future plan.

Political career 

Mohammad Giasuddin was elected to parliament from Narayanganj-4 in 2001 as a Bangladesh Nationalist Party. He and his two wives, and son were sued by the Bangladesh Anti-Corruption Commission for amassing 200 million takas beyond his known source of income and underreporting his wealth. He took over extortion activities in a territory of Nur Hossain after Hossain was arrested in the Seven Murders of the Narayanganj case.

References

External links
Gias Uddin Islamic collage

Bangladesh Nationalist Party politicians
Living people
8th Jatiya Sangsad members
Politics of Bangladesh
1952 births